Fearless BND (formerly Worth Dying For) is an American Christian worship band encompassing various artists from the Southern California based Ammunition Movement. Originating from the Modesto, California ministry Ammunition, they set out with their lead pastor, Jeremy Johnson to plant a church in the Southern California area in early 2012. Their self-titled debut album was released on April 15, 2008 by Integrity Music. Their second album, Love Riot was released in February 2011. An EP was released at the NEXT youth Convention in Hershey, Pennsylvania. In 2012, they released Live Riot.

Discography

Albums

EPs

Singles
 Anchored (Radio Version) (March 2017)
 Victorius (September 2018)
 "Más Amor" (April 2020)
 "Can't Get Enough" (May 2020)

References

External links 
 
 Integrity Music Artists- Worth Dying For
 Modesto Bee - Band out to 'break mold' of worship music

Musical groups established in 2005
Christian rock groups from California
Performers of contemporary worship music